Gerald (Jerry) C. DeGrieck is a public health manager and policy advisor in Seattle, Washington.  He and Nancy Wechsler served together on the Ann Arbor City Council, 1972–1974, while they were graduate students at the University of Michigan.  In 1973, they simultaneously became the first openly gay elected officials in the United States.

Ann Arbor City Council
DeGrieck and Wechsler were elected to the Ann Arbor City Council as members of the Human Rights Party on April 3, 1972. Political observers did not believe the third party had much chance of winning any seats, but the party's liberal platform appealed to young voters and beat university professors running as Democrats in the 1st and 2nd wards.

At the time of their election, Wechsler was a 22-year-old history student at University of Michigan, the first student member of the city council, and DeGrieck was a graduate student. In 1973, DeGrieck and Wechsler became the first openly gay male and openly lesbian elected officials in the United States when they came out together, at a press conference held in response to a homophobic incident at a local restaurant.

After finishing his term in 1974, DeGrieck moved to Seattle, Washington, where he went on to work for Seattle's Gay Pride Week and eventually became a public health manager and policy advisor to the City of Seattle.  He is currently Regional Health Administrator in the King County Department of Public Health.

Personal life
DeGrieck had a daughter, born in 1981, with a lesbian friend. He has not been as engaged in politics since the birth of his daughter.

References

Gay politicians
American LGBT rights activists
Politicians from Ann Arbor, Michigan
Politicians from Seattle
American LGBT city council members
Michigan city council members
Living people
Human Rights Party (United States) politicians
LGBT people from Michigan
LGBT people from Washington (state)
University of Michigan alumni
Year of birth missing (living people)